Upper Kangaroo River is a small village in the Southern Highlands of New South Wales, Australia, in Shoalhaven City Council. It is located on the Kangaroo River, a tributary of the Shoalhaven River.

Upper Kangaroo Valley

There is an area higher up the valley in  the Municipality of Kiama and the Wingecarribee Shire which has been officially defined as the locality of Upper Kangaroo Valley.

References

City of Shoalhaven
Localities in New South Wales
Towns of the Southern Highlands (New South Wales)